Neuronatin (Nnat) is a protein coding gene involved in mammalian brain development. It is located on Chromosome 20 in humans and is only expressed from the paternal allele in normal adults. It encodes the protein neuronatin, a proteolipid, that functions in the control of ion channels during brain development. Neuronatin begins the differentiation of pluripotent stem cells into cells with a neural fate by increasing their calcium levels. Neuronatin expression in neural tissues throughout the brain contributes to development of the nervous system. It is also expressed in several tissues outside of the brain. For example, expression in skin cells controls the differentiation of keratinocytes. Neuronatin expression functions not only in development, but other processes throughout the body. It also plays a direct and indirect role in diabetes. Increased expression in pancreatic islet beta cells causes the beta form of the protein to build an aggregate structure. This causes the cells to undergo apoptosis, thus leading to diabetes mellitus. Its effects on glycogen metabolism through the dephosphorylation and activation of the enzyme glycogen synthase may also play an indirect role in contributing to the disease. A different type of malformation in the gene also has the potential to cause a variety of cancers. Contained within the promoter region of the gene are three CpG islands. These imprint regions function in the regulation of gene expression through the process of cytosine methylation. The loss of methylation within these areas triggers an irregular cell growth, resulting in embryonic neoplasms.

References 

Proteins
Genes on human chromosome 20